Prathipadu Assembly constituency is an SC reserved constituency in Guntur district of Andhra Pradesh, representing the state legislative assembly in India. It is one of the seven assembly segments of Guntur Lok Sabha constituency, along with Tadikonda, Mangalagiri, Ponnuru, Tenali, Guntur West, and Guntur East. Mekathoti Sucharitha  is the MLA. She won the 2019 Andhra Pradesh Legislative Assembly election from YSR Congress Party. As of 25 March 2019, 250,247 voters reside in the constituency.

History 
It was formed with five mandals in 2009.

Members of Legislative Assembly

Election results

Assembly elections 2019

Assembly elections 2014

Assembly Elections 2009

Assembly Elections 2004

Assembly elections 1999

Assembly elections 1994

Assembly elections 1989

Assembly elections 1985

Assembly elections 1983

Assembly elections 1978

Assembly elections 1972

Assembly elections 1967

Assembly elections 1952

References

Assembly constituencies of Andhra Pradesh